V300 or V-300 may refer to:
 Cadillac Gage (Textron) LAV-300, a six-wheeled armoured fighting vehicle
 The missiles fired by the Soviet SA-1 Guild surface-to-air missile system